The 2018 Kentucky Wildcats football team represented the University of Kentucky in the 2018 NCAA Division I FBS football season. The Wildcats played their home games at Kroger Field in Lexington, Kentucky and competed in the Eastern Division of the Southeastern Conference (SEC). They were led by sixth-year head coach Mark Stoops.

The season was one of the most successful in Kentucky's history. In Kentucky's second game of the season, the team ended the then-longest current losing streak in an uninterrupted series in FBS when they defeated Florida for the first time since 1986, and the first time in Gainesville since 1979, ending a losing streak of 31 games. Two weeks later, the Wildcats upset No. 14 Mississippi State, and entered the AP Poll for the first time since 2007. Kentucky ended the regular season tied for second in the SEC East Division with a conference record of 5–3. They were invited to the Citrus Bowl, where they defeated No. 13 Penn State, their first bowl win since 2008. Kentucky ended the season with a record of 10–3 and were ranked 12th in the final AP Poll, the most wins and highest poll finish for the program since 1977.

The team's highly touted defense was anchored by unanimous All-American linebacker Josh Allen, who was named SEC Defensive Player of the Year and led the conference in sacks and tackles for loss. Allen won several national awards for defensive excellence, including the Bronko Nagurski Trophy, Chuck Bednarik Award, and the Lott Trophy; he became the first Kentucky player to receive any of these awards. On offense, the team was led by first-team All-SEC running back Benny Snell, who finished second in the conference in rushing with 1,449 yards and 16 touchdowns. Offensive lineman Bunchy Stallings was also named first-team all-conference. Quarterback Terry Wilson led the team in passing, finishing with 1,889 yards and 11 touchdowns. Head coach Mark Stoops was named SEC Coach of the Year.

Previous season
The Wildcats finished the 2017 season 7–6, 4–4 in SEC play to finish in a tie for third place in the Eastern Division. They were invited to the Music City Bowl where they lost to Northwestern.

Offseason

Spring game
The spring game took place on April 13 at Kroger Field.

Departures

2018 signing class

The 2018 football recruiting cycle was the first in which the NCAA authorized two signing periods for high school seniors in that sport. In addition to the traditional spring period starting with National Signing Day on February 7, 2018, a new early signing period was introduced, with the first such period falling from December 20–22, 2017.

Notably, the Wildcats did not sign a single in-state player in their 2018 class—the first time this had happened since 1940.

Preseason

Award watch lists
Listed in the order that they were released

SEC media poll
The SEC media poll was released on July 20, 2018 with the Wildcats predicted to finish in fifth place in the East Division.

Preseason All-SEC teams
The Wildcats had four players selected to the preseason all-SEC teams.

Offense

1st team

Benny Snell – RB

3rd team

C. J. Conrad – TE

Defense

2nd team

Josh Allen – LB

Mike Edwards – DB

Schedule

Personnel

Coaching staff
Kentucky head coach Mark Stoops enters his sixth season as the Wildcat's head coach for the 2018 season.  During his previous five seasons he led the Wildcats to an overall record of 26 wins and 36 losses.

Roster

Game summaries

Central Michigan

at No. 25 Florida

This was Kentucky's first win over Florida since 1986.

Murray State

No. 14 Mississippi State

South Carolina

at Texas A&M

Vanderbilt

at Missouri

No. 6 Georgia

at Tennessee

Middle Tennessee

at Louisville

vs. Penn State (Citrus Bowl)

Rankings

Players drafted into the NFL

References

Kentucky
Kentucky Wildcats football seasons
Citrus Bowl champion seasons
Kentucky Wildcats football